The Mummy Case is the 63rd title of the Hardy Boys Mystery Stories, written by Franklin W. Dixon.  It was published by Wanderer Books in 1980 and by Grosset & Dunlap in 2005.

Plot summary
When five Egyptian statuettes are stolen from a museum, the Hardy Boys travel to Egypt. En route, the boys are asked to safeguard a mysterious mummy and find themselves tangled in a web of international intrigue. On the Nile, the young detectives uncover a secret hiding place with countless stolen treasures.

References

The Hardy Boys books
1980 American novels
1980 children's books
Novels set in Egypt